Chinese city walls refer to defensive systems used to protect towns and cities in China in pre-modern times. In addition to walls, city defenses often included towers and gates.

Meaning of the word Chengqiang

The most specific Chinese word for a city wall is chéngqiáng (城墙), which can be used in two senses in the modern Chinese language. It broadly refers to all defensive walls, including the Great Wall of China, as well as similar defensive structures in areas outside of China such as Hadrian's Wall. More specifically Chengqiang refers to defensive walls built around a city or town. However, in classical Chinese, the character chéng (城) denoted the defensive wall of the "inner city" which housed government buildings. The character guō (郭) denoted the defensive wall of the "outer city", housing mainly residences. The phrase chángchéng (長城), literally "the long wall", refers to the Great Wall.

Colloquially chéng referred to both the walls and city so that both were synonymous with each other. A city was not a city without walls, however large it may be.

History

Pre-imperial

The invention of the city wall is attributed to the semi-historical sage Gun (鯀) of the Xia dynasty, father of Yu the Great. The traditional narrative tells that Gun built the inner wall to defend the prince and the outer wall to settle the people. An alternative narrative attributes the first city wall to the Yellow Emperor.

A number of neolithic walls surrounding substantial settlements have been excavated in recent years. These include a wall at a Liangzhu culture site, a stone wall at Sanxingdui, and several tamped earthen walls at the Longshan culture site.

Most settlements of significant size possessed a city wall from the Zhou dynasty onwards. The city wall of Pingyao was first constructed between 827 BC and 782 BC during the reign of King Xuan of Zhou. The city walls of Suzhou followed afterward under largely the same plan created by Wu Zixu in the 5th century BC. and lasted until their demolition in the 1960s and 1970s. Sieges of city walls (along with naval battles) were portrayed on bronze 'hu' vessels dated to the Warring States (5th century BC to 3rd century BC), like those found in Chengdu, Sichuan, China in 1965.

An example of walls built the Spring and Autumn to Warring States can include the Great Wall of Qi, which was built with a variety of different materials and construction techniques - such as one section being made of stones and another section being made of rammed earth.

Han dynasty

The walls of Han dynasty Chang'an were completed in 189 BC and covered a perimeter of 25.5 km while the later Eastern Han capital of Luoyang measured 4.3 km by 3.7 km.

Wu bi
By the end of the Eastern Han dynasty local gentry, clansmen, and villagers built more confined defensive structures in the form of square forts known as wū bì (塢壁). These were erected in remote countrysides and had particularly high walls, cornered watchtowers, and gates to the front and back. According to Stephen Turnbull, the wū bì are the closest approximation to the concept of a European castle that has ever existed in Chinese history.

According to Jan van Linschoten, writing in 1596, the Chinese evidently did not have castles or fortresses, but only city walls for defense:

Sui dynasty
Under the Sui dynasty, the capital of Chang'an was renamed Da Xingcheng and its outer wall was expanded to cover a perimeter of 35 km.

Tang dynasty
Under the Tang dynasty, the capital of Chang'an's outer walls measured 9.72 km east to west by 8.65 km north to south.

Jin dynasty
Under the Jin dynasty the capital of Zhongdu had walls covering a perimeter of 24 km and reached a height of 12m.

Composition

Material
The oldest form of wall construction in China was of rammed earth. Stone rubble was used for the foundation. Bricks were also used but were less common. From the Zhou dynasty, bricks were made of adobe, until the Han dynasty, when baked bricks became common. It's not certain how common brick faced walls were during the Shang and Zhou dynasties. In the state of Xia (Sixteen Kingdoms), the Xiongnu engineer Chigan Ali had the workers bake bricks for wall construction, and if a hammer blow could make a depression in them an inch deep, he would have the responsible worker killed. He also had the earth used to make the wall boiled with rice to harden it. While Chinese city walls always had an earthen core, the outer facings could be of either baked bricks laid in lime mortar, or stone where it was commonly available, such as in Sichuan. Bricks were also used for constructing the sewer network below the Beijing city wall in the 16th century. In addition to tamped earth, Chinese walls were sometimes reinforced with wood. A study of Han forts in Xinjiang found that they had brushwood and poplar interspersed between the layers of tamped earth.

Dimensions

At the Former Han capital of Chang'an, the city wall constructed around 200 BC by Yang Yangcheng was 15m tall and 12m wide. It was also protected by a moat 45m wide with a depth of 4.5m. During the Yuan dynasty, Suzhou's walls were over 7m tall and, 11m thick at the base, and 5m thick at the top. Most Chinese walls were sloped rather than vertical. Sometimes the walls were raised on a plinth or supporting platform. Aside from the wall itself were attached watch towers and gate towers, usually two or three stories tall. 

Wall bricks came in many dimensions depending on regional variations. In the north, 30cm x 23cm x 15cm was the most common, and in the south, 15cm x 13cm x 3cm.

Long-term strategic considerations meant that the walls of important cities often enclosed an area much larger than existing urban areas in order to ensure excess capacity for growth, and to secure resources such as timber and farmland in times of war. The city wall of Quanzhou in Fujian still contained one quarter vacant land by 1945. The city wall of Suzhou by the Republic of China era still enclosed large tracts of farmland. The City Wall of Nanjing, built during the Ming dynasty, enclosed an area large enough to house an airport, bamboo forests, and lakes in modern times.

Gates
Gates were placed symmetrically along the walls. The principal gate was traditionally located at the centre of the south wall. Gatehouses were generally built of wood and brick, which sat atop a raised and expanded section of the wall, surrounded by crenellated battlements. A tunnel ran under the gatehouse, with several metal gates and wooden doors. Camouflaged defensive positions are placed along the tunnel (in an effect similar to murder holes). Gatehouses were accessed by ramps, called horse ramps or bridle paths,, which sat against the wall adjacent to the gate.

Barbican

An "archery tower" was often placed in front of the main gatehouse, forming a barbican. In its final form during the Ming and Qing dynasties, the archery tower was an elaborate construction, of comparable height to the main gatehouse, which stands some distance in front of the main gatehouse. At its base was a gate. The archery tower is so-named because of its rows of archery (and later cannon) placements, from which defenders could fire projectiles on attackers. Auxiliary walls, running perpendicularly to the main wall, connect the archery tower with the main gatehouse, enclosing a rectangular area. This area serves as a buffer zone, should the first gate be breached. Its Chinese name, "jar walls", refers to the intended strategy whereby attackers coming through the archery tower would be trapped in the barbican, open to attack from all sides.

In large gates there may be multiple barbicans – the main gate of Nanjing (Gate of China, Nanjing) had three barbicans, forming the most elaborate system still in existence in China.

Towers
Towers that protruded from the wall were located at regular intervals along the wall. Large and elaborate towers, called corner towers (角楼, Jiǎolóu), were placed where two walls joined (i.e. at corners). These were significantly higher than the wall itself, and gave defenders a bird's eye view over both the city and its surroundings.

Moat
In larger cities, a moat surrounded the wall. This could be connected to canals or rivers both in the city and outside, thus providing both a defense and a convenient transportation route. Nearby waterways might be adopted or altered to connect to, or form part of, the moat.

Effectiveness against artillery

While China was the birthplace of gunpowder the guns there remained relatively small and light, weighing 80 kilograms or less for the large ones, and only a couple kilograms at most for the small ones during the early Ming era. Guns themselves had proliferated throughout China and become a common sight during sieges, so the question has arisen then why large guns were not first developed in China. According to Tonio Andrade, this was not a matter of metallurgy, which was sophisticated in China, and the Ming dynasty did construct large guns in the 1370s, but never followed up afterwards. Nor was it the lack of warfare, which other historians have suggested to be the case, but does not stand up to scrutiny as walls were a constant factor of war which stood in the way of many Chinese armies since time immemorial into the twentieth century. The answer Andrade provides is simply that Chinese walls were much less vulnerable to bombardment. Andrade argues that traditional Chinese walls were built differently from medieval European walls in ways which made them more resistant to cannon fire.

Chinese walls were bigger than medieval European walls. In the mid-twentieth century a European expert in fortification commented on their immensity: "in China … the principal towns are surrounded to the present day by walls so substantial, lofty, and formidable that the medieval fortifications of Europe are puny in comparison." Chinese walls were thick.

Even the walls of Constantinople which have been described as "the most famous and complicated system of defence in the civilized world," could not match up to a major Chinese city wall. Had both the outer and inner walls of Constantinople been combined, they would have only reached roughly a bit more than a third the width of a major wall in China. Andrade goes on to note that the walls of the marketplace of Chang'an were thicker than the walls of major European capitals.

Aside from their immense size, Chinese walls were also structurally different from the ones built in medieval Europe. Medieval European walls for castles were mostly constructed of stone interspersed with gravel or rubble filling and bonded by limestone mortar. Chinese walls used a variety of different materials depending on the availability of resources and the time period - ranging from stones to bricks to rammed earth. 
Sometimes, different sections of the same wall used different materials and construction techniques - such as one section being made of stones and another section being made of rammed earth. By the medieval period, Chinese walls with rammed earthen cores which absorbed the energy of artillery shots were common. Rammed earth walls also helped prevent intrusion by mining since only localized sections would collapse. Walls were constructed using wooden frameworks which were filled with layers of earth tamped down to a highly compact state, and once that was completed the frameworks were removed for use in the next wall section. During certain time periods such as the Song Dynasty and later, rammed earth walls were covered with an outer layer of bricks or stone to prevent corrosion, and during the Ming, earthworks were interspersed with stone and rubble. Most Chinese walls were also sloped, which better deflected projectile energy, rather than vertical.

The Chinese Wall Theory essentially rests on a cost benefit hypothesis, where the Ming recognized the highly resistant nature of their walls to structural damage, and could not imagine any affordable development of the guns available to them at the time to be capable of breaching said walls. Even as late as the 1490s a Florentine diplomat considered the French claim that "their artillery is capable of creating a breach in a wall of eight feet in thickness" to be ridiculous and the French "braggarts by nature." In fact twentieth century explosive shells had some difficulty creating a breach in tamped earthen walls.

Andrade goes on to question whether or not Europeans would have developed large artillery pieces in the first place had they faced the more formidable Chinese style walls, coming to the conclusion that such exorbitant investments in weapons unable to serve their primary purpose would not have been ideal.

Extant city walls
The city walls of Beijing, the last imperial capital of China,  survived in substantially complete form into the 1950s. But apart from the Forbidden City, whose walls remain well-preserved, city walls from the Ming dynasty have suffered wholesale demolition in the decades since. The only surviving sections are Qianmen's gate and arrow tower, Deshengmen's arrow tower, a section of the wall and Southeast Corner Tower preserved in the Ming City Wall Relics Park, and the Xibianmen corner tower. The Yongdingmen Gate was rebuilt in 2005.

Of the walls of other major historical cities, those of Nanjing, Xi'an and Kaifeng are notable for their state of preservation. The walls of Nanjing and Xi'an are Ming Dynasty originals with extensive Qing Dynasty and modern restorations, while the wall of Kaifeng visible today is largely the result of Qing Dynasty restoration.

The walls of some smaller cities and towns have survived more or less intact. These include the walls of Pingyao in Shanxi, Dali in Yunnan, Jingzhou in Hubei, and Xingcheng in Liaoning. Smaller garrison towns or fortifications include Diaoyu near Chongqing, Wanping county fortifications near Marco Polo Bridge in Beijing, the garrison town of Shanhai Pass, Jinyuan District in Taiyuan, Wanquan District in Zhangjiakou, Yongtai turtle town, Guangfu Ancient City in Hebei, Zhaoqing in Guangdong, and Qiansuo in Huludao, Liaoning.

Isolated remnants and some modern recreations can be seen today in many other cities. The walls of Luoyang in Henan survive as heavily eroded remains. The surviving walls of Shangqiu in Henan, while extensive, have heavily deteriorated over time. Only small parts of the city walls protecting the Confucian compound in Qufu are authentic, the rest having been demolished in 1978 and rebuilt in recent years. Some isolated gates of Hangzhou and Suzhou (especially Panmen Gate) have either survived or been rebuilt. Substantial remains of the gates of Zhengding in Hebei have survived but the walls have largely been stripped to their earthen core. One small section of the city wall of Shanghai is visible today.

Here is a full list of cities with intact city walls:
 Beijing, see City Wall of Beijing. Many parts of the walls of Beijing were demolished during the 1960s to open large streets around the city. A metro line also follows the location of the former city walls.
 Xiangyang
 Dali
 Shangqiu
 Jianshui
 Zhangjiakou, see Wanquan District
 Zhaoqing
 Guangfu Ancient City
 Xingcheng
 Liaocheng
 Kaifeng
 Qiansuo in Huludao
 Datong
 Daming County
 Yongtai Fortress
 Jingzhou
 Nanjing, see City Wall of Nanjing
 Linhai
 Qufu
 Taiyuan, see Jinyuan District
 Pingyao
 Shanghai (Old City (Shanghai) - largely destroyed in 1912, only fragments survive
 Songpan
 Walled villages can still be found in Mainland China and Hong Kong.
 Xi'an - The city of Xi'an has well-preserved walls with a water filled moat that is a tourist attraction incorporating small parks surrounding a busy and modern area of the city.
 Zhengding

Dimensions of famous city walls

Gallery

See also
Great Wall of China 
Sichuan anti-Mongol fortresses

References

Bibliography
 .
 
 
 
 
 
 
 
  (1st ed. 1955; 2nd ed. 1966)

Further reading
Wheatley, Paul, The Pivot of the Four Quarters (Edinburgh U. Press, 1971)

External links
  Comparative City History Research, Chinese Academy of Social Sciences and Osaka City University
Nanjing Zhonghua (China) Gate

Medieval defences

zh:城墙